Angyal is a Hungarian surname meaning "angel". Notable people with the surname include:

 Ákos Angyal,  Hungarian sprint canoeist
 Anna Angyal (1848–1874), Hungarian novelist
 Andras Angyal (1902–1960), Hungarian-American psychiatrist
 Éva Angyal (born 1955), Hungarian handball player
 Zoltán Angyal, Hungarian sprint canoeist

See also 
Ördögi angyal

Hungarian-language surnames